Parwana ( Moth) is a 1971 Indian Hindi-language psychological thriller film directed by Jyoti Swaroop. It stars Amitabh Bachchan, Navin Nischol, Yogeeta Bali, Om Prakash in lead roles and Shatrughan Sinha in a special appearance. In this film, Amitabh Bachchan plays his first negative role as an infatuated lover-turned-murderer.

Plot
Kumar (Amitabh Bachchan), an artist by profession is in love with Asha (Yogeeta Bali). Asha wins a trip to Ooty in a dance competition, and falls in love with a wealthy tea plantation owner, Rajeshwar (Navin Nischol). When Kumar finds out, he goes to Asha's uncle, Ashok Verma (Om Prakash) and demands Asha's hand in marriage. When he refuses, Kumar plots to kill him. The manner in which Kumar plans and executes the murder is regarded as an immensely brilliant and engaging sequence. Kumar boards and exits various modes of transportation to avoid any possibilities of suspicion by creating an alibi. He finally kills Ashok Verma and frames Rajeshwar in the hope of winning Asha's love. But Asha still loves Rajeshwar, and believes in his innocence. She makes a promise to Kumar to stay with him forever, if he could get Rajeshwar released from his death sentence. Kumar realises that Rajeshwar will always remain Asha's love. He writes down his confession giving details of execution of his plan of murder, gives it to Rajeshwar and commits suicide.

Cast
Amitabh Bachchan as Kumar Sen
Navin Nischol as Rajeshwar Singh
Yogeeta Bali as Asha Parekh
Om Prakash as Ashok Verma
Shatrughan Sinha as Public Prosecutor (Special Appearance)
Laxmi Chhaya as Kamla Singh
Lalita Pawar as Sarita Singh
Asit Sen as Mr. Ghosh
Rajeeta Thakur as Mrs. Ghosh
Helen as an Cabaret Dancer

Music
Since the director Jyoti Swaroop had a successful pairing with R. D. Burman in the movie Padosan, the music of the movie was originally to be composed by R. D. Burman. But the later had a creative differences with the director and hence Madan Mohan was roped in. The lyrics were penned by Kaifi Azmi. Most of the prominent singers of the industry have lent their voice in the soundtrack of this movie, like Kishore Kumar, Mohammed Rafi and Asha Bhosle.

Legacy
The sequence of Kumar's use of various modes of transportation was an inspiration for the 2007 Bollywood film Johnny Gaddaar, where it is shown that the film's protagonist has watched the film Parwana and does the same to avoid suspicion.

Home media 
The DVD version of the film was released by IndiaWeekly under its own label.

References

External links
 

1971 films
Films scored by Madan Mohan
1970s Hindi-language films
Indian romantic thriller films
Indian psychological thriller films
1970s psychological thriller films
1970s romantic thriller films